Hem Ljuva Hem ("Home Sweet Home") is a lifestyle magazine published in Stockholm, Sweden.

History and profile
Hem Ljuva Hem was started in 1999. The magazine is part of the Plaza Publishing Group. The publisher is Station 5 AB, a subsidiary of the group. The magazine is headquartered in Stockholm and covers articles on practical tips about home decoration.

In 2014 the circulation of Hem Ljuva Hem was 34,500 copies.

See also
 List of magazines in Sweden

References

External links
 Official website

1999 establishments in Sweden
Lifestyle magazines
Magazines established in 1999
Magazines published in Stockholm
Swedish-language magazines